"U Got 2 Let the Music" is a song by Italian Eurodance group Cappella, released in 1993 as the fourth single from their second studio album, U Got 2 Know (1994). The track samples "Sounds Like a Melody" by German musical group Alphaville and charted in various countries around the world, including the UK, where it reached number two on the UK Singles Chart, becoming the 36th-best-selling single of 1993 in the UK. In Austria, Finland and Switzerland, the song peaked at number one. Its accompanying music video received heavy rotation on MTV Europe in January 1994. "U Got 2 Let the Music" was re-released in 1998, 2004 and 2006, in remixed versions.

Background
Cappella started as a studio project with Italian producer and manager Gianfranco Bortolotti and his record company Media Record's team of DJs and producers ganging together, striving for the perfect commercial dance formula. The band had some minor hits in the late 80s and early 90s with singles like "Bauhaus (Push the Beat)" (1987), "Helyom Halib" (1989) and "Take Me Away" (1992). After Cappella became progressively more commercial, and received sustained success Bortolotti chose British singer/dancer Kelly Overett and American rapper Rodney Bishop as a regular public face of the band.

"U Got 2 Let the Music" would be the first release with Overett and Bishop. In a 1993 interview with Music & Media, Bortolotti said, "We have given Capella a new image with Anglo-Italian Kelly and American Rodney as the groups singers and public image. Capella's sound is also less techno and more pop-oriented now." The track samples the 1984 Alphaville song "Sounds Like a Melody", but none of its songwriters were given writing credits on U Got 2 Know.

Critical reception
John Bush from AllMusic described "U Got 2 Let the Music" as a "continent-wide Hi-NRG hit". Pan-European magazine Music & Media wrote, "Harold Faltermeyer meets the Italo house scene on a melody line not unlike Let's All Chant by the Michael Zager Band and ends up at the top of the UK dance chart." Dario Usuelli, PD at EHR Radio Deejay Network/Milan said, "It is a fast danceable pop song without pretention and has a good strong dance rhythm for the clubs." James Hamilton from Music Week'''s RM'' Dance Update called it a "typical breezy synth buzzed chanting italo techno-pop scamperer". Another editor, Tim Jeffery viewed it as a "typically big, bold and brash Euro stomper that's pretty much in the same vein as their last hit single", stating that "this is basically in-yer-face pop techno."

Chart performance
"U Got 2 Let the Music" went on to become a major hit on the charts in Europe. To date, it remains the most successful release by the group, peaking at number-one in Austria, Finland and Switzerland, as well as reaching number two in the United Kingdom. In the latter, the single peaked in its second week in the UK Singles Chart, on October 24, 1993. It was held off reaching the top spot by Meat Loaf's "I'd Do Anything for Love (But I Won't Do That)". "U Got 2 Let the Music" was the 36th best-selling single of 1993 in the UK. It also made it to the top 10 in Belgium, Denmark, Germany, Ireland, Italy, the Netherlands and Norway, plus on the Eurochart Hot 100, where it entered at number 46 in October, 1993 and peaked at number four on 15 January 1994. Additionally, it reached the top 20 in France, Iceland and Sweden. Outside Europe, it charted in Japan, Southeast Asia and Australia, where the song peaked at number 169. It earned a gold record in Austria, with a sale of 25,000 units, a silver record in the UK, after 200,000 singles were sold, and a platinum record in Germany, with 500,000 units sold there.

Airplay
"U Got 2 Let the Music" rolled out at number 17 when the first European airplay chart Border Breakers was compiled on 30 October 1993 due to crossover airplay in Central- and Northwest-Europe. It peaked at number three on 11 December.

Track listings

Charts

Weekly charts

Year-end charts

Certifications and sales

See also
List of number-one hits of 1994 (Austria)
List of number-one singles of the 1990s (Switzerland)

References

1993 songs
1993 singles
Cappella (band) songs
English-language Italian songs
Music Week number-one dance singles
Number-one singles in Austria
Number-one singles in Finland
Number-one singles in Switzerland
Songs written by Gianfranco Bortolotti